Cimarron Township, Kansas may refer to:

 Cimarron Township, Gray County, Kansas
 Cimarron Township, Meade County, Kansas
 Cimarron Township, Morton County, Kansas

See also 
 List of Kansas townships
 Cimarron Township (disambiguation)

Kansas township disambiguation pages